Asclepias feayi is a species of milkweed endemic to Florida. Its common name is Florida milkweed. It is in the family Apocynaceae.

Glyphodes floridalis is a species of moth known as the Florida milkweed vine moth.

References

feayi
Butterfly food plants